Rosendo Hernández González (11 March 1922 – 3 August 2006) was a Spanish football forward and manager.

Club career
Born in Santa Cruz de La Palma, Province of Santa Cruz de Tenerife, Hernández started playing football with local Canary Islands clubs SD Tenisca and CD Mensajero. At the end of the Spanish Civil War he joined Cultural y Deportiva Leonesa, followed by a move to Atlético Madrid which he never represented officially.

From 1950 to 1952, Hernández competed almost exclusively in La Liga (the exception being the 1950–51 season in Segunda División), representing RCD Español and Real Zaragoza and amassing totals of 143 games and 62 goals. After retiring in Aragon with SD Escoriaza he went into management, working in the top flight with Córdoba CF, Elche CF, Real Betis – he split the 1964–65 campaign between the two clubs, being in charge for only ten matches combined – and Las Palmas; he died at the age of 84 in his hometown.

International career
Hernández gained four caps for the Spain national team, during one year and four months. He was selected to the squad that competed at the 1950 FIFA World Cup, appearing in the tournament against the United States (3–1 win, first group stage) and Sweden (1–3 loss, second group phase).

References

External links

1922 births
2006 deaths
Spanish footballers
Footballers from the Canary Islands
People from La Palma
Sportspeople from the Province of Santa Cruz de Tenerife
Association football forwards
La Liga players
Segunda División players
Cultural Leonesa footballers
Atlético Madrid footballers
RCD Espanyol footballers
Real Zaragoza players
Spain international footballers
1950 FIFA World Cup players
Spanish football managers
La Liga managers
Segunda División managers
Real Zaragoza managers
UD Las Palmas managers
Córdoba CF managers
Elche CF managers
Real Betis managers
UE Lleida managers
Catalonia international guest footballers